Medicine Hat railway station is a Heritage Railway station in Medicine Hat, Alberta. It was built in 1906 and expanded in 1911–1912, using red brick from Medicine Hat and sandstone from Calgary.

References

External links 
 Some photos

Designated Heritage Railway Stations in Alberta
Disused railway stations in Canada